The 1912–13 Austrian First Class season was the second season of top-tier football in Austria. It was won by SK Rapid Wien as they won by seven points over Wiener AF.

League standings

Results

References
Austria - List of final tables (RSSSF)

Austrian Football Bundesliga seasons
Austria
1912–13 in Austrian football